Fritillaria pinetorum, the pinewoods fritillary or Davidson's fritillary, is an uncommon species of fritillary.

It is endemic to California, USA, where it is found in shady mountain forests in the Sierra Nevada (from Sierra County to Kern County) and the San Gabriel Ranges from Santa Barbara County to San Bernardino County. There are also isolated populations in eastern Inyo County and in Modoc County.

Description
The erect flower has six tepals each 1–2 cm long and yellow-mottled purple in color. It is similar in appearance to Fritillaria atropurpurea.

References

External links
Jepson Manual Treatment - Fritillaria pinetorum
USDA Plants Profile; Fritillaria pinetorum
Fritillaria pinetorum - Photo gallery

pinetorum
Endemic flora of California
Flora without expected TNC conservation status